Tom Ulan (born December 1, 1949 Westhampton, New York) is a retired American sprinter and three-time All-American. Ulan was the first track and field athlete from Rutgers University to reach international notoriety.

References

1949 births
Living people
American male sprinters
Universiade medalists in athletics (track and field)
Universiade gold medalists for the United States
Medalists at the 1970 Summer Universiade